Foster Forrest Watkins (November 17, 1917 – December 29, 2002) was an American football quarterback in the National Football League. He played for the Philadelphia Eagles from 1940 to 1941. He played college football for the West Texas A&M Buffaloes. He served in World War II for the United States Navy.

References

1917 births
2002 deaths
American football quarterbacks
Philadelphia Eagles players
West Texas A&M Buffaloes football players
Players of American football from Texas
People from Memphis, Texas
United States Navy personnel of World War II